The Maiden Saginaw was the only aircraft built by the fledgling CSC Aircraft Company.

Design and development
In 1924 Walter J. Carr found investors Walter Savage, Edward Savage and John Coryell willing to put money into a new enclosed cabin aircraft.

The Maiden Saginaw was a cantilever high-wing cabin monoplane with conventional landing gear with dual wheels and a  OXX-6 Engine.

Operational history
The Maiden Saginaw suffered from nearly zero forward visibility and an underpowered engine for its size. The prototype flew in May 1925 and did not win over investors. The product was later scrapped.

Specifications (Maiden Saginaw)

References

Single-engine aircraft